The Burning of Edinburgh in 1544 by an English sea-borne army was the first major action of the war of the Rough Wooing. A Scottish army observed the landing on 3 May 1544 but did not engage with the English force. The Provost of Edinburgh was compelled to allow the English to sack Leith and Edinburgh, and the city was burnt on 7 May. However, the Scottish artillery within Edinburgh Castle harassed the English forces, who had neither the time nor the resources to besiege the Castle. The English fleet sailed away loaded with captured goods, and with two ships that had belonged to James V of Scotland.

The plan

Henry VIII of England wished to unite the Kingdom of Scotland with the Kingdom of England, or at least bring the kingdom under his hegemony. He had contracted with the Regent Arran that Mary, Queen of Scots would marry his son, Prince Edward. But Arran allowed the Parliament of Scotland to revoke this agreement prompting Henry to declare war in December 1543, and now the Regent was making ground against his rebels who still supported the English marriage, such as the Earl of Lennox, Earl of Glencairn, the Earl of Cassillis, and the Earl of Angus. These nobles were in touch with Henry VIII via Lennox's secretary Thomas Bishop and Angus's chaplain, Master John Penven. Their letters to Henry VIII requested intervention, and in March he replied that a 'main army' was in preparation. Henry's Privy Council issued his instructions for the invasion force on 10 April 1544, and they were to:Put all to fire and sword, burn Edinburgh, so razed and defaced when you have sacked and gotten what ye can of it, as there may remain forever a perpetual memory of the vengeance of God lightened upon [them] for their falsehood and disloyalty. Edward Seymour, 1st Duke of Somerset, at this time called Lord Hertford was the King's Lieutenant of this Army Royal. He had considered establishing an English garrison at Leith, within walls made of timber topped with turf, and fortifying Inchkeith but the Privy Council vetoed this plan. Henry VIII had also asked him to destroy St Andrews, but Hertford pointed out the extra distance would be troublesome.

Hertford discussed with Privy Council the possibility of Scottish allies capturing Cardinal Beaton during his invasion. Henry believed that Beaton, a favourer of the Auld Alliance with France, was particularly responsible for the rejection of the marriage plan. Beaton's would-be kidnappers included James Kirkcaldy of Grange, Norman Leslie Master of Rothes, and John Charteris who offered to attempt to capture the Cardinal as he travelled in Fife. Their second scheme was to attack Arbroath while attention was focused on Edinburgh. This offer was made by Alexander Crichton of Brunstane who sent a messenger called Wishart to Hertford. Time was too short to offer military support for these plans, but if those concerned would join in the destruction of Church property they would be offered asylum in England and £1000 to fund their action. Any schemes more elaborate than a punitive raid on Edinburgh were shelved as Henry committed resources to the siege of Boulogne in France already planned for the summer.

Lord Hertford wrote to his Scottish ally, the Master of Morton, the future Regent Morton, in April 1544, discussing his journey towards Berwick-upon-Tweed, and hoping he would leave the castles of Dalkeith and Tantallon in the hands of allies.

Supplies
The army assembled at Newcastle upon Tyne and Gateshead. In April 1544, Sir Christopher Morris reported to Lord Hertford that he had organised munitions for the invasion at Berwick-upon-Tweed. These included:
 2 bastard culverins
 3 sakers
 8 falcons
 a falconette
 4 carriages with two 'bases' on each
 3000 bows, 1000 ready strung in 60 chests
 4000 sheaves of arrows in 80 chests
 4 barrels of bow strings; described further as 40 gross of 12 dozen, i.e., 5,760 strings
 480 Moorish pikes
 3000 bills
Anthony Neville of South Leverton was appointed Surveyor General of Victuals for the army.
Edward Shelley (who was one of the first English soldiers to be killed at the battle of Pinkie) reported that he had 40 thousand-weight of biscuit on 20 April. At Berwick, Shelley had problems getting enough coal or wood for baking and brewing. He had to ask permission to impress more supplies and hold sales to rotate his stock. 4000 border horsemen waited at Berwick for Hertford's signal. At first it was planned that they would make a diversionary attack on Haddington. Their commander Ralph Eure wrote from Alnwick on 28 April that these 'countrymen' were so poor he had to lend them money. He also asked for 1000 Yorkshire archers as reinforcement so that they could come to Edinburgh to support the landing. In the event, it was agreed that Hertford would summon Eure when he had disembarked his troops. When Eure's men arrived in Edinburgh they would get their pay.

Orders for the fleet

Orders for the fleet at Tynemouth were given on 28 April. All the ships were to be ready to weigh anchor at a favourable wind. The Lord Admiral, Viscount Lisle's flagship would fly the St George Cross on the fore-top mast and two top-lights at night. The ships of the 'vaward', the vanguard, would follow and anchor as near as possible. Hertford and the treasure-ship (Ralph Sadler was treasurer) would follow with his ensign on the main-top mast of the Rose Lion with two night lights on the shrouds. The Earl of Shrewsbury, captain of the rear-ward would fly the ensign on his mizzen mast, with a cresset light in the poop deck at night. The other ships were not to show flags or lights. Any ship that was transporting base or double base guns was to mount them on the fore-deck for the landing.

The ships were, for the vanguard or forward; the Pauncy, Minion, Swallow, Gabian of Ipswich, John Evangelist, Galley Subtle, with the barque of Calais. For the battle; the Sweepstake, Swan of Hamburgh, Mary Grace, and the Elizabeth of Lynn. For the rear-ward; the Great Galley, Gillian of Dartmouth, Peter of Foy, Anthony Fulford, and the Barque Riveley.

Defence
On 23 April 1544, all Scottish east coast towns were warned to entrench their bounds to resist the English navy. Men from neighbouring counties were summoned to muster in Edinburgh on 5 May. Extra gunners were hired for Edinburgh Castle, and Regent Arran's goods and the royal tapestries were carried up the Royal Mile from Holyroodhouse to the Castle and watched by his wardrobe servant Malcolm Gourlay. In the previous month an Edinburgh merchant James Johnston of Coates was paid £22 for going to "find out the Englishmen's purpose." The Burgh records are mostly missing for the year, so there is no detailed information on any defence measures provided by the town. The English account mentions that the Scots had cast great trenches and ditches to defend Leith.

The landing
An account of the episode was published later in 1544 in London as; The Late Expedition in Scotland made by the King's highness' army under the conduct of the Right Honourable the Earl of Hertford in 1544. A later account by Mary's secretary Claude Nau records the fleet burning St Mynettes on the north side of the Forth and taking fishing boats for landing-craft. John Knox gave an account of the landing from another Scottish viewpoint. The English fleet was sighted before noon on Saturday 3 May. Knox said that Cardinal Beaton dismissed the threat and sat calmly at dinner. At 6 pm there were 200 ships and an English pilot sounded the depths between Granton and Leith. Though experts could see this meant the English minded to land still there was no Scottish response. At daybreak on Sunday some of the smaller boats nosed onto land at Granton Crags and the troops landed using these as piers for the larger boats. According to Knox, when around 10,000 men were landed unchallenged the Cardinal and Regent Arran left Edinburgh.

The English account is similar, but mentions the presence of five or six thousand horsemen and some foot soldiers, positioned to prevent the short march from Granton to Leith at a ford on the Water of Leith. The Cardinal was with this army but after a few shots and only a couple of casualties on either side, the Scots abandoned their position at the ford of a stream, leaving their eight cannon. (Lisle said two slings and three serpentines were placed to fire across the river, agreeing with Lee's plan). The Earls of Huntly and Moray also left the field. Hertford's own dispatch describes this as a half-hour fight, "right sharply handled on both parts", with Peter Mewtas's hagbuters giving good service. The Admiral reported that Beaton stayed until he was in range of the handguns. He was wearing a frock of yellow velvet, cut and pulled out with white tinselled sarcenet.

Another stand before Leith itself gave some resistance, but folded after three expert Scottish gunners were killed by arrows. Hertford summoned Eure and the border horsemen with a brief note mentioning the lack of resistance, signed from the field on the west of Leith. The English then entered Leith unopposed, where they found two ships that had belonged to James V, the Salamander of Leith and the Unicorn. Some buildings in Leith were burnt, including St Ninian's chapel at the Bridge-end. Their overnight security was increased by recently constructed defensive entrenchments. Next day, Monday 5 May, the larger English ships were able to unload the heavier artillery on the quayside of the Shore of Leith. These guns were to be used against Edinburgh's gates and the castle. Cardinal Beaton left the area on Monday, the date recorded in his accounts for hiring a guide between Corstorphine and Stirling, (a journey then more usually made by boat). According to Eustace Chapuys, on the same day the Cardinal's enemy Alexander Crichton of Brunstane tried to meet Hertford at Leith, but an English guard shot him with an arrow in the leg. However, Hertford wrote that Brunstane was in the field with Arran and retreated with him to Linlithgow.

The Earl of Angus, George Douglas of Pittendreich and Lord Maxwell were in prison at Blackness Castle and Edinburgh Castle because they supported the English alliance. Arran, Guise, and the Cardinal now ordered their release so their supporters would help their cause. Maxwell later wrote that they were offered cash inducements, with incomes from church lands and pensions from the King of France.

Edinburgh

William Stourton (later commander of the Newhaven fort at Ambleteuse) was left in charge of Leith on 6 May with 1,500 men while the main force approached Edinburgh itself. They were met by the Provost Adam Otterburn and two heralds. Otterburn offered to give up the keys of the town on conditions. Hertford refused to accept as he had no authority to bargain. Another English herald went to the Castle, and returned with the news that the Earl of Huntly and Lord Home had brought 2000 horsemen to defend the town.

Sir Christopher Morris was then ordered to bring his artillery up the Canongate to assault Edinburgh's Netherbow Gate. During this operation some of the English gunners were killed. The infantry attacked the gate and, according to the English narrative, pulled one of the Scottish artillery pieces through its gunloop. The Scots could not retaliate due to heavy small arms fire and archery, during which Morris placed a cannon close to the gate. After three or four rounds, the gate was breached and the English army stormed through killing 300 or 400 defenders. The Scottish exchequer accounts record that their heavy guns were withdrawn from the High Street into the Castle. At this point, according to a report sent to Charles V, the English troops who were unused to urban warfare fought amongst each other, and William Howard, brother of the Duke of Norfolk, was hurt in the cheek by an English arrow. On the High Street, the central main street of Edinburgh, the English were exposed to the artillery of the Castle. They attempted to place their cannon above the Butter-Tron, between Lawnmarket and Castlehill. A shot from the Castle dismounted one English cannon, and Hertford ordered it to be deliberately burst. At the end of that day, the English retired from the town to their camp at Leith after starting a number of fires.

On 7 May, the fire-raising and looting continued, in the town and at Holyrood, and the English force was joined by Ralph Eure's 4000 border horsemen. Lord Hertford and his companions wrote that they watched Edinburgh burn from a hill beside the town and could hear "women and poor miserable creatures" crying out and blaming the Cardinal.

Nicholas Poyntz was sent to burn Kinghorn and other villages in Fife. The fortress on the island of Inchgarvie was captured and destroyed by Richard Brooke in the Galley Subtile on 6 May. Hertford had mentioned in his dispatch that it would have been useful to garrison Inchgarvie, but his orders from Henry VIII would not allow it.

Christopher Morris shipped the larger artillery, the ships sailed, and on 14 May the harbour and piers of Leith were demolished. Hertford, as the King's Lieutenant, knighted fifty-eight of his captains and his servant Thomas Fisher distributed three pounds and fifteen shillings amongst the men. The army left Leith by land on 15 May, stopping to burn Seton Palace and Haddington.

Edinburgh Castle

Although Hertford's army entered the town with little resistance, the defenders of the castle led by the Captain, James Hamilton of Stenhouse kept up an artillery barrage, firing down the line of the Royal Mile. The Clerk of the King's Works, Richard Lee, who was Captain of the Pioneers on this expedition and the Surveyor of Calais, William Burgate, declared the castle impregnable.

One of the Castle gunners was Andrew Mansioun, a French carver who had made fittings for the Unicorn, the yacht of James V and furniture for the royal palaces. His hand was injured when a cannon backfired, and in June 1544 he was given 44 shillings to pay for treatment.

Repairs were made in July 1544, when two of the gunners, Tibault Roqueneau and Piers Schouffene (French or Flemish, originally employed at Dunbar Castle) were working to improve the gun emplacements with gabions. The fore-wall of the castle was strengthened and repaired from July. This work was completed between July and August 1546 by three masons and four workmen (called barrowmen in the accounts).

Looting
Hertford estimated the value of goods in Leith at £10,000.  This included a large stock of three grades of linen cloth from Brittany. The ships were loaded with property seized in Edinburgh and Leith. He also took the Salamander and Unicorn, loading them with 80,000 cannon balls for ballast from the King's Wark arsenal. One surviving captured item is the Dunkeld Lectern, removed from Holyrood Abbey before the English soldiers fired the church. The lectern may have come into the possession of Sir Richard Lee who made plans of Edinburgh and Leith and assessed the strength of Edinburgh Castle. Lee certainly took a brass font from Holyrood which he gave to St Albans Abbey. He had it engraved with an inscription claiming that it was used for the baptism of the Kings of Scotland. As a relic of the monarchy it was destroyed during the English civil war. Longleat House has a manuscript copy of a translation of Hector Boece's Chronicle of Scotland, taken by John Thynne, Hertford's steward, from Holyroodhouse on Wednesday 7 May 1544.

Some of Hertford's muster lists survive at Longleat. These include the name of Sir William Norris of Liverpool. It has traditionally been asserted that carved panelling at his house of Speke Hall came from the Palace of Holyroodhouse though this has been challenged on stylistic grounds. At Speke there were legal books including Bartolus sup. primi degestis veteris, Venice (1499) and Panormitanus on the Decretals, Lyon (1501), with Robert Estienne's Bible (1532). William Norris wrote in each volume that they were won at Edinburgh on 8 May 1544.  The books passed to the library of the Liverpool Athenaeum in the 19th century. They were returned to Edinburgh in 2008 when the National Library of Scotland bought the collection. Inscriptions show they belonged to the Abbot of Cambuskenneth, who had a lodging on the south side of the Lawnmarket.

Burnt places
The returning English army burnt a number of settlements. The destruction was described by Walter Lynne in his appendix to Johann Carion's Cronicles, (1550); "burnyng and destroyeng the countrey about, sparyng nether castel, towne, pyle nor vyllage, untyll they had overthrowen and destroyed many of them, as the borough and towne of Edenborough with the Abbey called Holy Rodehouse, and the kynges Palice adjoyned to the same. The towne of Lyth also with the haven and peyre. The castell and vyllage of Cragmyller, the Abbay of Newbottell, and parte of Muskelborowe towne, the Chappel of our lady of Lawret. Preston towne, and the castell Hatintowne wyth the Freres and Nunery, and castell of Oliuer Sancklers, the towne of Dunbar, Laurestone wyth the Graunge, with many other townes, castels, vyllages and pyles."

The following places burnt or demolished were listed by William Patten, with other places and dates from a manuscript in the Harley Collection.

Places burnt by the fleet under the command of Nicholas Poyntz; Kinghorn, St Monans, South Queensferry, a part of Pittenweem, Burntisland

Aftermath
News spread quickly throughout Europe, though Nicholas Wotton at Speyer had to show the importance of Edinburgh as the capital of Scotland using the chronicles of Hector Boece and John Mair. However, apart from the physical destruction, a recent historian of the conflict Marcus Merriman concluded that the army, "really did little of any long-term effect." Although Edinburgh was not again threatened by the war, rebuilding was a slow process. New buildings were built on the exact site of their predecessors. Tenure of the Edinburgh lands was complex with numbers of owners claiming incomes from sub-divided buildings, with some portions 'mortified' to the chaplains of altars. At the end of the war, in September 1551 and February 1552 Parliament laid down guidelines for sharing the burden of costs for re-building the burnt lands and tenements "brint be the auld inimies of Ingland."

Hertford's knights and captains
Hertford, as the King's lieutenant knighted the men listed below. The names of his captains are recorded in pay-books and muster lists preserved at Longleat House. A book of 'conduct money' notes where the captains came from, e.g., Hugh Chomley from Cholmondeley, Cheshire with 100 men, paid for travelling 130 miles to Edinburgh and back, William Norris from Liverpool, John Markham from Cottham near Retford, Nottinghamshire.Knighted on Sunday, 11 May, at Leith;

Knighted on Tuesday, 13 May, at Leith;

Knighted on Sunday, 18 May, at Butterdean near Coldingham, (called Kilspindie Castle);

References

Further reading
 Balfour Paul, J, 'Edinburgh in 1544 and Hertford's invasion', Scottish Historical Review, vol.8 no.30, (1911), pp. 113–131
 Merriman, Marcus, 'The Assured Scots: Scottish collaborators with England during the Rough Wooing', Scottish Historical Review,vol.47 no.143 (April 1968), pp. 10–34.

External links
 Edinburgh 1544 Project reconstructs the appearance of the Scottish capital in 1544. 
 Calderwood, David, The History of the Kirk of Scotland, vol.1, Wodrow Society (1842), see pp. 176–178
 Laing, David, ed., 'John Knox's 'History of the Reformation', Books 1 & 2,' The Works of John Knox, vol. 1, Bannatyne Club, Edinburgh (1846), see pp. 119–123
 Thomson, Thomas, ed., John Lesley's History of Scotland, from the death of King James I in the year 1436 to 1561, Bannatyne Club (1830), see pp. 180–188
 An English Garner, Tudor Tracts, London (1903), see pp. 38–51, 'The Expedition into Scotland'
 Bain, Joseph, ed., Hamilton Papers, vol. 2, HM General Register House (1892)
 Historical Manuscripts Commission HMC: Calendar of the Manuscripts of the Marquis of Salisbury preserved at Hatfield House, vol.1 (1883), see pp. 23–38
 Haynes, Samuel, ed.,  A Collection of State Papers,... from the year 1542 to 1570, ... now Remaining at Hatfield House, London (1740), see pp. 19–36
 State Papers of Henry VIII, vol.5 part IV continued, London (1836), Scotland and the borders, 1534–1546
 National Library of Scotland: the 'Cambuskenneth Collection', books taken by William Norris of Liverpool in 1544 
 British Library, London: the 1544 plan shows English soldiers (red-flags) facing the Scottish (black-flags) over the Water of Leith near Canonmills, and the entry at Holyrood.

1544 in Scotland
16th-century fires
Burned buildings and structures in the United Kingdom
Conflicts in 1544
Disasters in Edinburgh
Fires in Scotland
History of Edinburgh
Looting
Rough Wooing
Urban fires in the United Kingdom
16th-century military history of Scotland
Amphibious operations involving the United Kingdom
Mary, Queen of Scots
Edinburgh Castle
Sieges involving Scotland
Sieges involving England